Nora (The Flash) may refer to:

 Nora West-Allen, the daughter of Barry and Iris from the TV series The Flash
 Nora Allen (The Flash), Barry's mother from the TV series The Flash